LAX is an American drama television series set at the Los Angeles International Airport, drawing its name from the airport's IATA airport code, "LAX". The series premiered on September 13, 2004 on NBC, and aired through April 16, 2005.

Overview
LAX is a drama focusing on the day-to-day operations of the airport, with its runway manager, Harley Random (Heather Locklear), and its terminal manager, Roger de Souza (Blair Underwood). In the final episode, Harley leaves her job at LAX after she is told by Roger that he wants stability back in his life and no longer wants to be romantically involved with her.

LAX premiered on NBC on September 13, 2004. Ten episodes aired before NBC announced in November 2004 that no further episodes would be produced. The show was moved to Saturdays at 8pm ET and the final episode aired on April 16, 2005. Thirteen episodes total were aired.

Cast

Main
 Heather Locklear as Harley Random
 Blair Underwood as Roger De Souza
 Paul Leyden as Tony Magulia
 Frank John Hughes as Henry Engels
 Wendy Hoopes as Betty
 David Paetkau as Nick

Recurring
 Joel David Moore as Eddie Carson
 Sasha Barrese as Caitlin Mansfield

Notable guests
 Chad Todhunter as Mystery Man
 Tony Hawk as himself
 Daniel Morton as a Serbian co-pilot
 Sam Doumit as Rachel, Senator's daughter
 Charisma Carpenter as Julie, Harley's sister

Episodes

Production
LAX (originally titled HUB, and then The Hub) was announced on NBC's development slate on December 19, 2003, after being scrapped by NBC during the previous development season in winter 2003. On January 14, NBC greenlighted production on the pilot. Anthony and Joe Russo signed on as directors of the pilot on February 6. On May 17, 2004 NBC announced that they had picked up the pilot to series. This show was not renewed for a second season.

Exterior shots for the pilot episode were filmed in Texas, although sources differ on whether Dallas/Fort Worth International Airport or Fort Worth Alliance Airport stood in for Los Angeles International. Many other scenes were filmed using a vacant terminal and a disused Boeing 727 at Ontario International Airport, interspersed with establishing shots of the real LAX airport.

The theme song for the show was the beginning of "Mr. Blue Sky" by Electric Light Orchestra. For the opening sequence of the final episode, a different excerpt of the song was used.

Broadcast and syndication
On February 22, 2014, it is announced reruns of LAX would air on Ion Television in fall 2014.

Reception
In a survey by Philips, LAX got 17% of the votes for most anticipated new series.

The show was frequently the butt of comedic jokes due to its poor ratings, including Jay Leno, who remarked the show was "so bad that the actual Los Angeles Airport is thinking of changing its name to avoid being associated with the show." The 13 episodes of the program averaged 6.52 million viewers.

LAX lost 19.09% of the viewers in its time slot versus the previous season, which was occupied by Third Watch.

References

External links

2004 American television series debuts
2005 American television series endings
2000s American workplace drama television series
Aviation television series
English-language television shows
NBC original programming
Television series by Universal Television
Television shows set in Los Angeles
Los Angeles International Airport